HD 68375 (HR 3216) is a solitary star in the northern circumpolar constellation Camelopardalis. It is faintly visible to the naked eye with an apparent magnitude of 5.54 and is estimated to be 289 light years distant.

HD 68375 has a stellar classification of G8 III, indicating that it is a red giant. It is currently on the horizontal branch, generating energy via fusion inside a helium core. Specifically, it is a red clump star, at the cool end of the horizontal branch where stars with near-solar metallicity are found. Nevertheless, it has nearly double the mass of the Sun and radiates at 49 times the luminosity of the Sun from its enlarged photosphere.

References

G-type giants
Horizontal-branch stars
Camelopardalis (constellation)
BD+76 00310
068375
040793
3216